Chah Beygi (also Romanized as Chāh Beygī) is a village in Golestan Rural District, in the Central District of Sirjan County, Kerman Province, Iran. At the 2006 census, its population was 48, in 12 families.

References 

Populated places in Sirjan County